

The City Cemetery of Raleigh, also known as Old City Cemetery, was authorized in 1798 by the North Carolina General Assembly as Raleigh's first burying ground. It was originally laid out in four equal quarters with the northern two quarters reserved for residents, the southwestern for visitors, and the southeastern for Negroes, both free and slaves. The cemetery was enclosed in 1898 by a cast-iron fence that was formerly around Union Square to keep straying livestock out of the State Capitol grounds. A network of cobblestone driveways with granite curbstones run through the cemetery. In 1857, the city boundaries were extended to include the cemetery, and the city charter provided for a resident caretaker. Many persons of Raleigh's and North Carolina's early period are interred at City Cemetery including governors, mayors, politicians, newspaper editors, military officers, ministers, doctors, planters, attorneys, bankers, and Scottish and English stonemasons who helped build the Capitol.

City Cemetery was listed on the National Register of Historic Places on 12 September 2008.

Historic grave sites
 Joel Lane
 Jacob Johnson
 John Rex
 Joseph Gales
 Weston R. Gales
 John Devereux
 William Boylan
 Thomas Meredith
 William Peace
 Governor Charles Manly
 William Henry Haywood
 Dr. Josiah Ogden Watson
 Romulus M. Saunders
 William White
 Sion Hart Rogers
 Colonel William Polk
 General Lawrence O. Branch
 General William A. Blount
 Richard Hines
 Absalom Tatom
 William Shaw
 William Hill
 Anna J. Cooper

Gallery

References

External links
  North Carolina State Historic Preservation Office
 

Cemeteries on the National Register of Historic Places in North Carolina
1798 establishments in North Carolina
Protected areas of Wake County, North Carolina
Geography of Raleigh, North Carolina
Tourist attractions in Raleigh, North Carolina
National Register of Historic Places in Raleigh, North Carolina
Historic districts on the National Register of Historic Places in North Carolina